Attilio Nicora (16 March 1937 – 22 April 2017) was an Italian prelate of the Catholic Church who held senior positions in the administration of the Roman Curia as president of the Administration of the Patrimony of the Apostolic See from 2002 to 2011 and president of the four-person Executive Board of the Financial Information Authority (FIA) from 2011 to 2014. He was bishop of Verona from 1992 to 1997. He was given the personal title of archbishop in 2002 and was made a cardinal in 2003.

Biography
Nicora was born in Varese, Italy, and ordained a priest in 1964. Prior to being ordained, he had earned a license in Canon law from the Pontifical Gregorian University in Rome as well as a license in theology from the Theological Faculty in Milan. After his ordination, he became a professor of canon law at the Theological Seminary of Venegano.

Nicora became a bishop in 1977, when he was appointed auxiliary bishop of Milan and titular bishop of Furnos Minor. Nicora oversaw the 1984 revision of the concordat, between Italy and the Holy See. From 1992 to 1997, he served as bishop of Verona. In 2002, Nicora became President of Administration of the Patrimony of the Apostolic See, where his responsibility was administering the Vatican's income from properties. This position is comparable to that of a chief financial officer in a corporation. Upon the death of a Pope all major Vatican officials automatically lose their positions during a sede vacante, and so Nicora lost his position on 2 April 2005 due to the death of Pope John Paul II but later was confirmed to office by Pope Benedict XVI on 21 April.

Nicora was made cardinal deacon of San Filippo Neri in Eurosia in 2003 by Pope John Paul II. He participated in the papal conclave that elected Pope Benedict XVI in 2005 and again in the conclave that elected Pope Francis in 2013.

On 19 January 2011, Pope Benedict XVI named Nicora the President of the four-person Executive Board of the Vatican's recently established Financial Information Authority (FIA). The agency is charged with monitoring the monetary and commercial activities of Vatican agencies, such as the Governorate of Vatican City State, the Vatican Bank, the Administration of the Patrimony of the Apostolic See, the Congregation for the Evangelization of Peoples, and smaller agencies such as the Vatican Pharmacy, the Vatican Supermarket, and the Vatican Museums. On 30 January 2014, Pope Francis accepted his resignation from that position and named Bishop Giorgio Corbellini to succeed him as Interim President.

Pope Benedict XVI appointed Nicora Pontifical Legate for the Basilicas of St. Francis and St. Mary of the Angels in Assisi. After being a cardinal deacon for ten years, he was promoted to cardinal priest by Pope Francis on 12 June 2014.

Nicora died in a hospital in Rome on 22 April 2017.

References

External links
An interview with Nicora

1937 births
2017 deaths
People from Varese
16th-century Italian cardinals
Bishops of Verona
Administration of the Patrimony of the Apostolic See
Cardinals created by Pope John Paul II
Pontifical Gregorian University alumni
Università Cattolica del Sacro Cuore alumni
20th-century Italian Roman Catholic bishops